The Age of Marriage Act 1929 (19 & 20 Geo 5 c 36) was an Act of the Parliament of the United Kingdom which increased the age of marriage to sixteen. It was passed in response to a campaign by the National Union of Societies for Equal Citizenship.

The whole Act was repealed as to Scotland by section 28(2) of, and Schedule 3 to, the Marriage (Scotland) Act 1977.

Corresponding provision was made for Northern Ireland by the Age of Marriage Act (Northern Ireland) 1951.

Section 1
At common law and by canon law a person who had attained the legal age of puberty could contract a valid marriage. A marriage contracted by persons either of whom was under the legal age of puberty was voidable. The legal age of puberty was fourteen years for males and twelve years for females. This section amended the law so that a marriage contracted by persons either of whom was under the age of sixteen years was void. This provision is re-enacted by section 2 of the Marriage Act 1949.

In section 1(1), the words from the beginning to "Provided that" were repealed by Part I of the Fifth Schedule to the Marriage Act 1949.

The proviso to section 1(1) was repealed by the Fourth Schedule to the Sexual Offences Act 1956 and by Schedule 2 to the Sexual Offences (Scotland) Act 1976.

Section 1(2)(a) was repealed by Part I of the Fifth Schedule to the Marriage Act 1949.

See also sections 6(2) and 14(3) of the Sexual Offences Act 1956.

Reception
In Pugh v Pugh, Pearce J said:

The Justice of the Peace and Local Government Review said that "Acts of Parliament that lay down hard and fast rules interfering with individual liberty are certain to give rise to some unsatisfactory results" and that this particular Act was "no exception".

See also
Marriage Act
Marriage in England and Wales
Marriage in Scotland

References
Halsbury's Statutes, 

United Kingdom Acts of Parliament 1929
Marriage law in the United Kingdom
Marriage age